HMS Achille was a 74-gun third-rate ship of the line of the Royal Navy. She was built by Cleverley Bros., a private shipyard at Gravesend, and launched on 16 April 1798. Her design was based on the lines of the captured French ship . She was the fourth Royal Navy ship to be named after the Greek hero Achilles in the French style.

Achille at Trafalgar
Achille opened fire on the rear of the French and Spanish fleet at 12.15, engaging the 74-gun , for fifteen minutes, before sailing on to meet  of 80 guns, which had already been battling with other British ships. After hours of fierce fighting, Argonauta fell silent and closed her gunports, but before Achille could accept her surrender, her French namesake  of 74 guns, moved in to engage the British ship. After exchanging broadsides, the French ship sailed on and was replaced on the starboard side by the 74-gun French ship , and for the next hour and a quarter she lay close alongside Achille, receiving a pounding that eventually forced Berwick to surrender with over 250 casualties – almost half her crew. Achille took possession, and transferred some of her crew back on board as prisoners. Achille suffered 13 killed and 59 wounded in the battle, in stark comparison to the heavy losses she inflicted on her French and Spanish adversaries.

On 17 July 1812, boats from Achille and  captured or destroyed 12 enemy trabaccolos off Venice.

Fate
Achille continued in active service until 1815, when she was decommissioned at Chatham, and laid up at Sheerness. She survived in this state until 1865, when she was sold for £3,600 to be broken up.

Notes

References
Citations

Bibliography

 
 Lavery, Brian (2003) The Ship of the Line – Volume 1: The development of the battlefleet 1650–1850. Conway Maritime Press. .

 

Ships built in Gravesend
Pompée-class ships of the line
1798 ships